Lichida is an order of typically spiny trilobite that lived from the Furongian to the Devonian period. These trilobites usually have 8–13 thoracic segments. Their exoskeletons often have a grainy texture or have wart or spine-like tubercles. Some species are extraordinarily spiny, having spiny thoracic segments that are as long or longer than the entire body, from cephalon (head) to pygidium (tail). The sections of the pygidia are leaf-like in shape and also typically end in spines.

The order is divided into two families, Lichidae, and Lichakephalidae.  Some experts group the families of the closely related order Odontopleurida within Lichida, too, whereupon the family is then divided into three superfamilies, Dameselloidea, containing the family Damesellidae, Lichoidea, containing the families Lichidae and Lichakephalidae, and Odontopleuroidea, containing the family Odontopleuridae.

Taxa traditionally placed within Lichida 
As mentioned earlier, the order Lichida is divided into two families.

Lichidae 

Acanthopyge 
Akantharges
Allolichas
Amphilichas
Apatolichas
Arctinurus
Autoloxolichas
Borealarges
Ceratarges
Conolichas
Craspedarges
Dicranogmus
Dicranopeltis
Echinolichas
Eifliarges
Gaspelichas
Hemiarges
Homolichas
Hoplolichas
Hoplolichoides
Jasperia
Leiolichas
Lichas
Lobopyge
Lyralichas
Mephiarges
Metaleiolichas
Metalichas
Metopolichas
Neolichas
Nipponarges
Ohleum
Oinochoe
Otarozoum
Paraleiolichas
Perunaspis 
Platylichas
Probolichas
Pseudotupolichas
Radiolichas
Richterarges
Rontrippia
Terataspis
Terranovia
Trimerolichas
Trochurus
Uralichas
Uripes

Lichakephalidae 

Acidaspidella
Acidaspides
Acidaspidina
Archikainella
Belovia
Bestjubella
Brutonia
Colossaspis
Eoacidaspis
Lichakephalus
Lichokephalina
Metaacidaspis
Paraacidaspis
Usoviana

References

Further reading

External links

 
Trilobite orders
Furongian first appearances
Cambrian trilobites
Ordovician trilobites
Silurian trilobites
Devonian trilobites
Frasnian extinctions